Anice is a given name. Notable people with the name include:

 Anice Badri (born 1990), Tunisian footballer
 Anice Das (born 1985), Indian-born Dutch speed skater
 Anice George, Indian nurse and academic
 Anice Johnson (1919–1992), American politician

Fictional characters with the name include:

 Anice Farm, from the anime television series Sonic Soldier Borgman